Saarlouis (Sarrelouis in French) is a Kreis (district) in the middle of the Saarland, Germany. Neighboring districts are Merzig-Wadern, Sankt Wendel, Neunkirchen, Saarbrücken, and the French département Moselle.

History
The district was part of the Holy Roman Empire of the German nation. The biggest part of the district was part of duchy of Lorraine which gradually came under French sovereignty (still as a part of the holy empire) between 1737 and 1766. Other villages were part of the county of Nassau-Saarbrücken. The  territory of the city Saarlouis  which was built to protect the border, came to France as part of the three Bishoprics. Other villages, which today are considered to be too small to form villages of their own were independent imperial territories. The district showed the fundamental problem of the whole empire: A strong influence of foreign rulers and micro-sized territories. After the Napoleonic wars the area went to Prussia, which in 1816 created the district as part of its Rhineland province. Between 1936 and 1945 it was called Saarlautern, when the Nazi government attempted to conceal the name's French origin.

Geography
The main river in the district is the Saar.

Coat of arms
The checked black-and-white top part of the coat of arms is taken from the coat of the Hohenzollern, to remember that the area belonged to the German Empire (which was ruled by the Hohenzollern dynasty) directly. The bottom part is the coat of arms of the Lorraine, as Saarlouis belonged to Duchy of Lorraine 1100-1766. The star stands for the French fortress of Saarlouis, the origin of the city, which was built in a star form. The fleur-de-lis comes from the coat of arms of the city Saarlouis.

Towns and municipalities

Education

Primary schools 

 Römerschule Pachten
 Philipp-Schmitt-School Dillingen
 Odilienschule Dillingen
 Primsschule Dieffeln
 Primary school Landsweiler
 Primary school Lebach
 Primary school Steinbach
 Nikolaus-Groß-School Lebach
 Primary school "Im Vogelsang" Saarlouis
 Primary school Römerberg Roden
 Primary school "Im Alten Kloster" Fraulautern
 Primary school Steinrausch
 Primary school Prof. Ecker Lisdorf
 Primary school in den Bruchwiesen Beaumarais
 Primary school Bous
 Primary school Ensdorf
 Primary school Nalbach
 Niedschule Hemmersdorf
 Primary school Rehlingen
 Primary school Gutberg Saarwellingen
 Astrid-Lindgren-School Reisbach
 Stefanschule Schmelz with Dependance Limbach
 Johannesschule Hüttersdorf
 Kirchbergschule Schwalbach
 Bachtalschule Elm
 Laurentiusschule Hülzweiler
 St. Oranna Berus
 St. Bonifatius Überherrn
 Primary school Wallerfangen
 Primary school Gisingen

Community schools 

 School at the Römerkastell Dillingen
 Sophie Scholl Community School Dillingen
 Theeltalschule Lebach
 Nikolaus-Groß-School Lebach
 Community School Saarlouis "In den Fliesen"
 Martin Luther King School Saarlouis
 Community school Wadgassen-Bous
 Johannes Gutenberg School Schwalbach
 School at Litermont Nalbach
 Lothar Kahn School Rehlingen
 School at the Waldwies Saarwellingen
 Kettelerschule Schmelz
 School at the Warndtwald Ueberherrn
 Bisttal School Wadgassen / Bous
 School at the Limberg, Wallerfangen

High schools 

 Albert Schweitzer High School Dillingen
 Technical-scientific High School Dillingen
 Geschwister-Scholl High School Lebach
 Johannes-Kepler High School Lebach
 High School at the Stadtgarten (municipal park) Saarlouis
 Max Planck High School Saarlouis
 Robert Schuman High School Saarlouis

Vocational schools 

 KBBZ Dillingen
 TGBBZ Dillingen
 BBZ Lebach
 KBBZ Saarlouis
 TGSBBZ Saarlouis
 Nursing School DRK-Hospital Saarlouis

Special schools 

 AWO-Förderschule mental development leases
 Anne Frank School Saarlouis
 District Special School G Saarwellingen
 State development school social development Wallerfangen

References

External links

 

 
Districts of the Saarland